Nataliya Olehivna Kalnysh (also Natallia Kalnysh, ; born 2 July 1974 in Kryvyi Rih) is a Ukrainian sport shooter.

Career
Kalnysh made her official debut for the 2000 Summer Olympics in Sydney, where she placed twenty-eighth in the 10 m air rifle, and twenty-ninth in the 50 m rifle 3 positions, with total scores of 390 and 568 points, respectively.

She won a silver medal in the rifle three positions at the 2002 ISSF World Shooting Championships in Lahti, Finland, accumulating a score of 674.1 points.

At the 2004 Summer Olympics in Athens, Kalnysh finished fourteenth in the preliminary rounds of the women's 10 m air rifle, with a total score of 394 points, tying her position with five other shooters including United States' Hattie Johnson, and Poland's Agnieszka Staroń. She also accumulated a score of 677.2 targets (579 in the preliminary rounds and 98.2 in the final) in her second event, 50 m rifle 3 positions, by four tenths of a point (0.4) behind Germany's Barbara Lechner, finishing only in eighth place.

Eight years after competing in her first Olympics, Kalnysh qualified for her third Ukrainian team, as a 34-year-old, at the 2008 Summer Olympics in Beijing, by finishing second in the rifle three positions (STR3X20) from the 2006 ISSF World Cup series in Milan, Italy. She placed twenty-seventh in the women's 10 m air rifle by one point behind Bulgaria's Desislava Balabanova from the final attempt, with a total score of 393 points. Nearly a week later, Kalnysh competed for her second event, 50 m rifle 3 positions, where she was able to shoot 194 targets in a prone position, 185 in standing, and 192 in kneeling, for a total score of 571 points, finishing only in thirty-first place.

Olympic results

References

External links
 NBC 2008 Olympics profile

1974 births
Living people
Ukrainian female sport shooters
Olympic shooters of Ukraine
Shooters at the 2000 Summer Olympics
Shooters at the 2004 Summer Olympics
Shooters at the 2008 Summer Olympics
Shooters at the 2016 Summer Olympics
Sportspeople from Kryvyi Rih
European Games competitors for Ukraine
Shooters at the 2015 European Games
Shooters at the 2019 European Games
21st-century Ukrainian women